"Seventeen Forever" is a song by the American pop band Metro Station, released as the fourth and final single from the group's 2007 self-titled debut studio album. The single was released on December 13, 2008. The song peaked at number 42 on the Billboard Hot 100 and is certified gold in the United States.

The song also debuted at number 53 on the Australian Singles Chart, and peaked at number 43. The song was released as the band's second UK single on July 13, 2009 and peaked at number 89.

Background and composition
The group originally released the song on MySpace in 2006 and topped the MySpace Music's Unsigned Bands chart. Not only did it garner the attention of fans, but of drummer Anthony Improgo, who joined the band. According to frontman Trace Cyrus, the song is very "meaningful" to the band and it was the first song they made. 

Trace Cyrus told Kerrang! magazine that this song is "about wanting to be in a relationship with a girl who’s underage so bad and how age limitations don’t let you do that." The track runs at 140 BPM and is in the key of C minor.

Music video
On December 5, 2008 the music video was released on MTV and has premiered in Canada through the Muchmusic and the MuchAxs video streaming website. The video is shot at night with the band performing at a carnival in Santa Clarita, California. The video was directed Josh Forbes and includes cameos from Miley Cyrus, Billy Ray Cyrus, and Mitchel Musso.

Track listing

Charts

Weekly charts

Year-end charts

Certifications

Release history

References

External links

Metro Station interviews with Take 40 Australia

2008 singles
Metro Station (band) songs
Juvenile sexuality in music
2007 songs
Song recordings produced by S*A*M and Sluggo
Columbia Records singles